Jennifer L. Glass is Centennial Commission Professor of Liberal Arts in Sociology at the University of Texas at Austin. She was previously Professor of Sociology at the University of Southern California, University of Iowa and the University of Notre Dame.

Early life 
Glass received her B.A. of Social Science at the New College of Florida in 1977. She received her M.S. of Sociology in 1979 and Ph.D. in Sociology in 1983, both from the University of Wisconsin-Madison.

Career 
She was Professor of Sociology at the University of Notre Dame from 1985 to 1994. She subsequently joined the Department of Sociology at the University of Iowa from 1994 to 2011. She joined the department of sociology at the University of Texas at Austin in 2012. 

She has been on various editorial board of academic journals, including the Gender & Society, Journal of Marriage and the Family, Social Problems, and American Sociological Review. Her work has also been featured in The New York Times.

She received American Sociological Association's Jessie Bernard Award in 2020.

Selected work 

 Glass, Jennifer L.; Estes, Sarah Beth (1997-08). "The Family Responsive Workplace". Annual Review of Sociology. 23 (1): 289–313. doi:10.1146/annurev.soc.23.1.289.
 Glass, Jennifer; Bengtson, Vern L.; Dunham, Charlotte Chorn (1986). "Attitude Similarity in Three-Generation Families: Socialization, Status Inheritance, or Reciprocal Influence?". American Sociological Review. 51 (5): 685–698. doi:10.2307/2095493.

References

External links 
 Faculty page at the University of Texas at Austin
 Biographical sketch
 Jennifer Glass Interview, via YouTube, retrieved 2021-05-22
 "Having kids won't make you happier | Life Examined", interview via KCRW, retrieved 2021-05-22 

American sociologists
University of Southern California faculty
Year of birth missing (living people)
Living people
University of Texas at Austin faculty
New College of Florida alumni
University of Wisconsin–Madison alumni
University of Notre Dame faculty